Kruttika Desai is an Indian film, theatre and television actress. In the 90s, she gained initial fame in the serial Buniyaad and later for her role of Vishkanya in popular fantasy series Chandrakanta, and later in the next 2 decades, she went on to earn huge recognization for portraying a wide range of characters in television soap operas like Kismet, Dewaar, Noorjahan, Junoon, Lipstick, Tumhari Disha. She also hosted many shows like Mansi, Superhit Muqabla, and Superhit Hangama. She is the first television actress to go bald for a show, Uttaran.

Acting career
Krutika is involved in "Akansha", a theatre workshop for street children and has also acted in some Gujarati plays including Shodh Pratishodh. The actress went on to shave her head for the serial Uttaran, making her the first woman to go bald in the history of Indian Television. Krutika played many popular roles in Indian soap operas, most notably Ram Milaayi Jodi, and also Uttaran etc. In 2015, she played the pivotal role of Shanti Devi in the Star Plus serial Mere Angne Mein which became one of the most successful and long-running shows. The show ended in August 2017 after a successful run of 2 years.

Personal life
Krutika husband Imtiaz Khan is the brother of actor Amjad Khan. The couple have a daughter named Ayesha Khan. Their nephews Seemaab Khan and Shadaab Khan are actors in the industry.

Filmography

Films 

2022  Blurr

Television

Web series

References

External links
 

Living people
Actresses from Mumbai
20th-century Indian actresses
21st-century Indian actresses
Indian film actresses
Indian stage actresses
Indian television actresses
Indian soap opera actresses
Gujarati theatre
Actresses in Hindi cinema
Actresses in Hindi television
Year of birth missing (living people)